Nu'uausala Sia Tuilefano is an American Samoan shotputter, who has represented American Samoa at the Pacific Games and Samoa at the Commonwealth Games.

Tuilefano grew up in Oceanside, California and was educated at El Camino High School and Coffeyville Community College. She later attended the University of Houston, where she was part of their track and field team. In 2021 she set a new UH record in the shotput, with a throw of 16.49m.

She represented American Samoa at the 2019 Pacific Games in Apia, winning silver in the shotput with a throw of 13.12m.

On 14 July 2022 she was selected as part of Samoa's team for the 2022 Commonwealth Games in Birmingham.

References

Living people
People from Oceanside, California
American Samoan female shot putters
Samoan female shot putters
Commonwealth Games competitors for Samoa
Year of birth missing (living people)